Robert Ferguson may refer to:

People
Robert Ferguson (minister) (c. 1637–1714), Scottish religious minister, conspirator and political pamphleteer
Robert Ferguson of Raith (1769–1840), Scottish MP for Fife and Kirkcaldy Burghs
Sir Robert Ferguson, 2nd Baronet (1795–1860), Irish MP for Londonderry
Robert Ferguson (physician) (1799–1865), Scottish physician
Robert Ferguson (1802–1868), Scottish army officer and MP for Kirkcaldy Burghs
Robert Ferguson (Carlisle MP) (1817–1898), Member of Parliament for Carlisle
Robert Ferguson (Ontario politician) (1834–1901), Ontario merchant and political figure
Robert Ferguson (Manitoba politician) (1866–1958), politician in Manitoba, Canada
Robert Ferguson (American football) (born 1979), American football wide receiver
Robert Ferguson (footballer, born 1886) (1886–1962), Scottish footballer who played for Liverpool
Robert Ferguson (footballer, born 1902) (fl. 1919–1932), Scottish footballer who played for Sunderland and Middlesbrough
Robert Ferguson (footballer, born 1908) (1908–?), English professional footballer
Robert Ferguson (English footballer) (fl. 1906–1907), Bradford City player
Robert Ross Ferguson (1917–2006), reeve (mayor) of Fort Qu'Appelle, Saskatchewan
Robert E. Ferguson (1924–2016), American politician
Robert W. Ferguson (born 1965), American lawyer and 18th Attorney General of Washington State
Robert McNair Ferguson (1829–1912), Scottish mathematician
Robert Ferguson (physicist) (born 1932), nuclear physicist

Other uses 
A fictional character in The Adventure of the Sussex Vampire, a 1924 Sherlock Holmes story by Sir Arthur Conan Doyle
Robert Ferguson House, near Newark, New Castle County, Delaware, built 1790–1810
Robert W. Ferguson House, a historic home in Emathla, Florida

See also
Robert Fergusson (disambiguation)
Bob Ferguson (disambiguation)
Bobby Ferguson (disambiguation)